Slieve-na-Aura, also known as Slieveanorra, is a  mountain in County Antrim, Northern Ireland. Situated near the village of Loughguile, the mountain sits above Slieveanorra Forest.

References

Mountains and hills of County Antrim